= Deaths in motorsport =

This is a page with information on deaths that have occurred during motorsport events. Auto racing is a dangerous sport by its nature and has seen a large number of deaths. In the second half of the 20th century safety standards and car construction were improved so that the number of deaths has fallen noticeably: In Formula 1 deaths were a regular occurrence earlier in the history of the series but between 1994 and 2015 there has been only one death. Still, deaths in motorsport are still a regular occurrence. In particular motorcycle racing claims more deaths than car racing due to the nature of motorcycle riding and the lack of protection for a rider in the event of a crash.

Deaths in motorsport can be categorised as follows:

== Driver deaths in motorsport ==
This section covers all driver deaths in car or truck racing events. These have either taken place at racing circuits or oval racing venues. Deaths in all series and in all types of vehicles are included, from club or national level series to high-profile events like Formula 1 and Champ Car.

== Rider deaths in motorcycle racing ==
This covers rider deaths in all forms of motorcycle racing. This includes all circuit and road racing events of any level. High-profile events like Moto GP and the Isle of Man TT are included alongside other international, national or club level events.

== Driver and co-driver deaths in rallying events ==
Rallying is an offroad motorsport, generally featuring a number of timed stages on varying surfaces to crown an overall winner. Deaths in this form of motorsport often occur when the car leaves the road and crashes into something on the roadside or suffers a significant fall. Deaths at all levels are included, from national events to major events like the World Rally Championship and the Dakar Rally
